Robert Orlando (born November 22, 1964) is an American filmmaker, author, and media entrepreneur. His films range from animated shorts to full-length documentaries, including recent documentaries and books about Pope John Paul II, Ronald Reagan, Donald Trump, General George Patton and St. Paul the Apostle.
He is the author of the 2021 Simon and Schuster book, Citizen Trump: A One Man Show.

His best-performing film was The Divine Plan: Reagan, John Paul II and the Dramatic End of the Cold War (2019). He is co-author with Paul Kengor of the 2019 book based on the film. The film was screened at the Vatican and the White House.

Early life and education 

Orlando was born in New York City to an Italian Catholic family. He was given his first movie camera at the age of 8, and a lifelong love affair with film began.  “Movie-making came naturally to me,” he said. He attained his B.A in 1988, after attending the School of Visual Arts he studied scriptwriting, directing, editing, and film criticism.

1984-1990: After graduation, he pursued his scholarly interest in religious history at St. John's University and Columbia University before getting his certification as a teacher with the New York City Department of Education. He taught “Introduction to Filmmaking and Scriptwriting” at the School of Visual Arts.

Career 

His first professional experience was as a studio manager for Vision Interfaith Satellite Network. Orlando's 1988 film debut, See Her Run, was chosen for the Tel Aviv International Student Film Festival.  His first full-length breakthrough film in 2000 was Moment In Time. His visionary documentary Aspire Series for Princeton University, which illuminated science and art, from 2008 to 2011.

In 1995 he formed his own boutique multimedia company, Nexus Media. Nexus relocated in 2008 from New York City to Princeton, New Jersey, where he lives with his wife, Margaret, who administers a Princeton University program, and their son, Dante. Nexus creates scripts, films, and promo videos that help major Fortune 100 companies define and convey their message.  Clients have included American Express, IBM, and Johnson and Johnson.

He wrote and directed three notable documentaries in the past few years.

Orlando’s recent projects include 2023’s book and film “The Shroud,”   a documentary investigating the controversial burial cloth of Jesus Christ through a dual lens of science and faith, and “Trump’s Rosebud,”  where Orlando looks at how Donald Trump’s affair with media, similar to Charles Foster Kane’s relationship with the media in “Citizen Kane,” launched his presidential career. In 2024 he plans to complete his series “Apostle Paul: The Final Days”  and a new narrative film, “Susie Lee: Daughter of Mercy.”

Recent films 
 Apostle Paul: A Polite Bribe (2013)
  Silence Patton (2018)
 The Divine Plan (2019)

Books 
 Apostle Paul: A Polite Bribe, Cascade Books, 2014, ISBN 978-1-62564-972-0
 The Divine Plan: Reagan, John Paul II and the Dramatic End of the Cold War, With Paul Kengor, ISI Books, 2019, ISBN 978-1-61017-154-0
 The Tragedy of Patton: A Soldier's Date With Destiny Humanix Books, 2020, ISBN 978-1-630-06176-0
 Citizen Trump: A One Man Show Post Hill Press distributed by Simon Schuster, 2021, ISBN 978-1-64293-916-3

References

External links 
 Robert Orlando website.

1964 births
Living people
Film directors from New York City
Writers from New York City